The Adele people are an ethnic group and tribe of the Ghanaian-Togo border area indigenous to the Jasikan, Nkwanta South and Nkwanta North Districts of the Volta Region centered around the towns of Dadiasi and Dutukpene in Ghana and the Sotouboua Prefecture of the Centrale Region centered around the towns of Assouma Kedeme and Tiefouma in Togo. The Adele people are agricultural, primarily farming yams, cassava, plantain, beans, and rice.

Demographics 
A 1960 census estimated that there were 2,400 Adele people in Ghana. Today, the tribe has population size of approximately 37,400.

Other cultural groups in the Ghana-Togo border region include the Atwode, Basari, Bimoba, Buems, Chokosi, Ewe, Guang, Konkomba, Kotokoli, and Likpe peoples.

Language 

The Adele language, one of the Ghana–Togo Mountain languages, is spoken by Adele, Kunda, Animere, and Northern Ghanaian peoples.

Adele Women
The Adele Women is an agricultural group in the Upper Volta region of Ghana. They practice subsistence farming and have been trained in Permaculture from the Permaculture Network in Ghana, under the leadership of Paul Yeboah.

References 

Ethnic groups in Togo
Ethnic groups in Ghana
Ethnic groups in Africa